Colonel Harold Carmichael Wylly, CB (18 January 1858 – 3 September 1932) was a British Army colonel and military historian.

Life
Wylly was born in Meerut in the North West Province of British India, the son of E. M. Wylly, a judge in the High Court of Agra.  He was educated at Henley Grammar School, Wimbledon School and the Royal Military College, Sandhurst, before embarking on a career as an army officer when he was commissioned a lieutenant on 11 September 1878, serving first with the 95th (Derbyshire) Regiment of Foot, which in 1881 was merged into the Sherwood Foresters, as the 2nd battalion (Derbyshire Regiment). He served in the Anglo-Egyptian War in 1882, was promoted to captain on 1 May 1884, served in the Sikkim Expedition in 1888, was promoted to major on 26 May 1893, and served in the Tirah Campaign 1897–98. In February 1900 he joined his battalion when it transferred to Malta. Following the outbreak of the Second Boer War, the 1st battalion of his regiment had embarked for South Africa in November 1899. Leaving his own battalion at Malta, Wylly transferred to South Africa where he was promoted to lieutenant-colonel in command of the 1st battalion from 11 February 1900. For services during the war, he was mentioned in despatches (dated 8 April 1902), and appointed a Companion of the Order of the Bath (CB) in the South Africa honours list published on 26 June 1902. The battalion stayed in South Africa until after the war, then transferred on the SS Wakool to a new posting at Hong Kong in September 1902.

From 1907 Wylly published works on military topics, including in 1908 a biography of Sir Joseph Thackwell.  In 1913, in the buildup to the First World War, Wylly became editor of RUSI Journal, the journal of the Royal United Services Institute, a position he held until 1923.  Many of his later works dealt with the First World War.

In 1929 he was awarded the Chesney Gold Medal, the highest award of the Royal United Services Institute.

Works
 Davis, John, and H. C. Wylly (1895) The History of the Second, Queen's Royal Regiment, Now the Queen's (Royal West Surrey) Regiment: From 1715 to 1799. (R.Bentley & son).
 
 
 
 
 
 
  
 
 
  
 Neill's 'Blue Caps Vol I & II 1826-1914
 History of the Queen's Royal Regiment, Gale & Polden 1925.

References 

 
 

British military historians
1858 births
1932 deaths
British Indian Army officers
People from Meerut
Graduates of the Royal Military College, Sandhurst
British Army personnel of the Anglo-Egyptian War
Sherwood Foresters officers
British Army personnel of the Second Boer War
British magazine editors
Academic journal editors
Companions of the Order of the Bath
British military personnel of the Sikkim expedition
Military personnel of British India